Larry Luick (born 1958) is an American politician. He is a member of the North Dakota State Senate from the 25th District, serving since 2010. He is a member of the Republican party.

References

1958 births
21st-century American politicians
Living people
Republican Party North Dakota state senators